On 18 June 1920 local elections were held in Zagreb, in the Kingdom of Serbs, Croats and Slovenes. The elections were held for the revoked mandates from last local elections in March 1920. The Croatian Union won a majority of seats and Vjekoslav Heinzel was named the new mayor of Zagreb.

Results

Mayoral elections

Democratic Party boycotted the elections and asked to schedule elections for the entire city assembly. The assembly after these elections had 28 members of the Croatian Union, 8 representatives of the Croatian Party of Rights, 5 from the Democratic Party, 5 from the Croatian People's Peasant Party, 1 from the Social Democratic Party, 2 representatives of Jewish parties and 1 socialist. On 17 August 17, 1920 Vjekoslav Heinzel was elected mayor with 27 votes, while Vladimir Prebeg from the Party of Rights received eight votes. Eight votes were invalid (blank ballots).

References

See also
List of mayors of Zagreb
1920 Kingdom of Serbs, Croats and Slovenes Constitutional Assembly election

Zagreb 1920-06
Elections in Zagreb
Zagreb 1920-06
Zagreb 1920-06
Zagreb local election 1920-06
Local election 1920-06